Phyllonotus peratus is a species of sea snail, a marine gastropod mollusk in the family Muricidae, the murex snails or rock snails.

Description
The size of an adult shell varies between 45 mm and 66 mm. The coloring is a neutral cream with brown features.

Distribution
This species occurs in the Pacific Ocean between Mexico and Panama.

References

 Merle D., Garrigues B. & Pointier J.-P. (2011) Fossil and Recent Muricidae of the world. Part Muricinae. Hackenheim: Conchbooks. 648 pp. page(s): 116

External links
 

Muricidae
Gastropods described in 1960